The 2006 FIBA Europe Under-20 Championship for Women Division B was the second edition of the Division B of the Women's European basketball championship for national under-20 teams. It was held in Druskininkai, Lithuania, from 7 to 16 July 2006. Belarus women's national under-20 basketball team won the tournament.

Participating teams

First round
In the first round, the teams were drawn into two groups. The first four teams from each group advance to the quarterfinals, the other teams will play in the 9th–11th place playoffs.

Group A

Group B

9th–11th place playoffs

9th–11th place semifinal

9th place match

Championship playoffs

Quarterfinals

5th–8th place playoffs

Semifinals

7th place match

5th place match

3rd place match

Final

Final standings

References

2006
2006–07 in European women's basketball
International youth basketball competitions hosted by Lithuania
FIBA U20
July 2006 sports events in Europe